XHMIX-FM is a commercial radio station located in La Rumorosa, Baja California, Mexico, broadcasting to the Imperial Valley, California area of the United States on 98.3 FM.  XHMIX airs a Contemporary hit radio music format branded as "Power 98 Jams".

History
The 98.3 frequency in Rumorosa was put out for bid in 1992 as XHRBN-FM. Francisco Javier Fimbres Durazo, who already ran XEKT 1390 AM in Tecate, won the concession and built the station, quickly changing the callsign to XHFJ-FM for his initials. During this time, Fimbres operated his stations in association with Cadena Baja California, which owned XEMBC-AM 1190  XEWV-AM, & XEWV-FM. In 2003, XHFJ became XHMIX-FM to go with the station's name at the time, Mix 98. The station later became known as "Zona 98" with a rock format.

The current concessionaire, controlled 60% by Fimbres Durazo, was created in 2007.

In 2016, XHMIX was authorized to increase its effective radiated power from 30,000 watts to 50,000.

References

External links
Official Website

Radio stations in Baja California